W. David "Dai" John (birth unknown – death unknown) was a Welsh rugby union and professional rugby league footballer who played in the 1900s and 1910s.

Playing career

International honours
Dai John won a cap for Wales (RU) while at Salford in 1913.

Championship final appearances
During Dai John's time there was Salford's 5-3 victory over Huddersfield in the Championship Final during the 1913–14 season.

Challenge Cup Final appearances
Dai John played  in Salford's 0-5 defeat by Bradford F.C. in the 1906 Challenge Cup Final during the 1905–06 season at Headingley Rugby Stadium, Leeds on Saturday 28 April 1906.

Club career
Dai John originally played rugby union, turning out at half-back for Penygraig RFC in the Rhondda. While still a teenager he switched codes to rugby league. John was considered a "Probable" for the 1910 Great Britain Lions tour of Australia and New Zealand, but ultimately he was not selected for the tour. Writing at the time in the Evening Express, their rugby league correspondent suggested that it was John's height, standing at 5 foot 3 inches, that cost him his place.

References

Penygraig RFC players
Place of birth missing
Place of death missing
Rugby league five-eighths
Rugby league fullbacks
Rugby union halfbacks
Salford Red Devils players
Wales national rugby league team players
Welsh rugby league players
Welsh rugby union players
Year of birth missing
Year of death missing